Government Abdur Rashid Talukdar Degree College is a public college in Dashmina, Patuakhali, Barisal, Bangladesh. It was established in 1994. The college is affiliated with National University. In 2018 the college was officially declared ‍as Government.

References

External links
 http://www.barisalboard.gov.bd/102164

Colleges in Patuakhali District
Universities and colleges in Patuakhali District